The Wannsee Conference is a 1984 German TV film portraying the events of the Wannsee Conference, held in Berlin in January 1942. The script is derived from the minutes of the meeting. Since no verbatim transcription of the meeting exists, the dialogue is necessarily fictionalised. The main theme of the film is the bureaucratic nature of the genocide.

The same events were later depicted in the 2001 English-language film Conspiracy.

Cast

The cast of the 15 participants of the conference is as follows:

 Dietrich Mattausch as SS-Obergruppenführer Reinhard Heydrich: Chief of the Reich Security Main Office (RSHA) and Deputy Reichsprotektor of Bohemia and Moravia.
 Gerd Böckmann as SS-Obersturmbannführer Adolf Eichmann: Head of RSHA IV B4.
 Peter Fitz as Dr Wilhelm Stuckart: State Secretary, Reich Ministry for the Interior.
 Günter Spörrle as SS-Oberführer Dr Gerhard Klopfer: State Secretary, Party Chancellery.
 Hans-Werner Bussinger as Martin Luther: Undersecretary and SS liaison, Foreign Ministry.
 Franz Rudnick as Ministerialdirektor Dr Friedrich Wilhelm Kritzinger: Deputy Head, Reich Chancellery.
 Jochen Busse as Dr Georg Leibbrandt: Head of Political Department, Reich Ministry for the Occupied Eastern Territories.
 Harald Dietl as Gauleiter Dr Alfred Meyer: Deputy Reich Minister, Reich Ministry for the Occupied Eastern Territories.
 Robert Atzorn as SS-Gruppenführer Otto Hofmann: Chief of the SS Race and Settlement Main Office.
 Dieter Groest as SS-Sturmbannführer Erich Neumann: Director, Office of the Four Year Plan.
 Friedrich Georg Beckhaus as SS-Gruppenführer Heinrich Müller: Chief of RSHA Department IV (the Gestapo).
 Reinhard Glemnitz as Dr Josef Bühler: State Secretary for the General Government of occupied Poland.
 Martin Lüttge as SS-Sturmbannführer Dr Rudolf Lange: Commander of the Sicherheitsdienst (SD) in Latvia.
 Rainer Steffen as Dr Roland Freisler: State Secretary, Reich Ministry of Justice.
 Gerd Rigauer as SS-Oberführer Dr Karl Eberhard Schöngarth: SD officer assigned to the General Government.
 Anita Mally, as the secretary

See also 
 Matti Geschonneck (director): Die Wannseekonferenz (The Wannsee Conference, a 2022 German TV film)

References

External links

1984 films
1984 television films
West German films
Austrian television films
German television films
Holocaust films
Films about Nazi Germany
1980s German-language films
German-language television shows
Films set in 1942
Das Erste original programming